The 2021 Xfinity 500 was a NASCAR Cup Series race held on October 31, 2021, at Martinsville Speedway in Ridgeway, Virginia. Contested over 501 laps -- extended from 500 laps due to an overtime finish, on the .526 mile (.847 km) short track, it was the 35th race of the 2021 NASCAR Cup Series season, the ninth race of the Playoffs, and final race of the Round of 8.

Report

Background

Martinsville Speedway is an International Speedway Corporation-owned NASCAR stock car racing track located in Henry County, in Ridgeway, Virginia, just to the south of Martinsville. At  in length, it is the shortest track in the NASCAR Cup Series. The track is also one of the first paved oval tracks in NASCAR, being built in 1947 by H. Clay Earles. It is also the only race track that has been on the NASCAR circuit from its beginning in 1948. Along with this, Martinsville is the only NASCAR oval track on the entire NASCAR track circuit to have asphalt surfaces on the straightaways, then concrete to cover the turns.

Entry list
 (R) denotes rookie driver.
 (i) denotes driver who are ineligible for series driver points.

Qualifying
Kyle Larson was awarded the pole for the race as determined by competition-based formula.  This was the final round that it was scheduled, but NASCAR made a change at Bristol in March when the formula was used when rain cancelled qualifying.

Starting Lineup

Race

Stage Results

Stage One
Laps: 130

Stage Two
Laps: 130

Final Stage Results

Stage Three
Laps: 240

Race statistics
 Lead changes: 15 among 7 different drivers
 Cautions/Laps: 15 for 91
 Red flags: 0
 Time of race: 3 hours, 42 minutes and 48 seconds
 Average speed:

Media

Television
NBC Sports covered the race on the television side. Rick Allen, 1997 race winner Jeff Burton, Steve Letarte and 2014 race winner Dale Earnhardt Jr. called the race from the broadcast booth. Dave Burns, Parker Kligerman, Marty Snider and Dillon Welch handled the pit road duties from pit lane. Rutledge Wood handled the features from the track.

Radio
MRN covered the radio call for the race, which was also simulcast on Sirius XM NASCAR Radio. Alex Hayden, Jeff Striegle and 7 time Martinsville winner Rusty Wallace had the call for MRN when the field raced down the front straightaway. Dave Moody covered the action for MRN when the field raced down the backstraightway into turn 3. Steve Post and Kim Coon covered the action for MRN from pit lane.

Standings after the race

Drivers' Championship standings

Manufacturers' Championship standings

Note: Only the first 16 positions are included for the driver standings.

References

Xfinity 500
Xfinity 500
NASCAR races at Martinsville Speedway
Xfinity 500